Green Day is an American rock band formed in the East Bay of California in 1987 by lead vocalist and guitarist Billie Joe Armstrong, together with bassist and backing vocalist Mike Dirnt. For most of the band's career, they have been a power trio with drummer Tré Cool, who replaced John Kiffmeyer in 1990 before the recording of the band's second studio album, Kerplunk (1991). Touring guitarist Jason White became a full-time member in 2012, but returned to his touring role in 2016. Before taking its current name in 1989, Green Day was called Sweet Children, and they were part of the late 1980s/early 1990s Bay Area punk scene that emerged from the 924 Gilman Street club in Berkeley, California. The band's early releases were with the independent record label Lookout! Records. In 1994, their major-label debut Dookie, released through Reprise Records, became a breakout success and eventually shipped over 10 million copies in the U.S. Alongside fellow California punk bands Bad Religion, the Offspring, Rancid, NOFX, Pennywise and Social Distortion, Green Day is credited with popularizing mainstream interest in punk rock in the U.S.

Though the albums Insomniac (1995), Nimrod (1997), and Warning (2000) did not match the success of Dookie, they were still successful, with the former two reaching double platinum status, while the latter achieved gold. Green Day's seventh album, a rock opera called American Idiot (2004), found popularity with a younger generation, selling six million copies in the U.S. Their next album, 21st Century Breakdown, was released in 2009 and achieved the band's best chart performance. It was followed by a trilogy of albums, ¡Uno!, ¡Dos!, and ¡Tré!, released in September, November, and December 2012, respectively. The trilogy did not perform as well as expected commercially, in comparison to their previous albums, largely due to lack of promotion and Armstrong entering rehab. Their twelfth studio album, Revolution Radio, was released in October 2016 and became their third to debut at No. 1 on the  Billboard 200. The band's thirteenth studio album, Father of All Motherfuckers, was released on February 7, 2020.

In 2010, a stage adaptation of American Idiot debuted on Broadway. The musical was nominated for three Tony Awards: Best Musical, Best Scenic Design, and Best Lighting Design, winning the latter two. The band was inducted into the Rock and Roll Hall of Fame in 2015, their first year of eligibility. Members of the band have collaborated on the side projects Pinhead Gunpowder, the Network, Foxboro Hot Tubs, the Longshot, and the Coverups. They have also worked on solo careers.

Green Day has sold more than 75 million records worldwide, making them one of the world's best-selling artists. The group has been nominated for 20 Grammy awards and has won five of them with Best Alternative Album for Dookie, Best Rock Album for American Idiot and 21st Century Breakdown, Record of the Year for "Boulevard of Broken Dreams", and Best Musical Show Album for American Idiot: The Original Broadway Cast Recording.

History

Formation and Lookout! years (1987–1993) 

In 1987, friends and guitarists Billie Joe Armstrong and Mike Dirnt, 15 years old at the time, along with bassist Sean Hughes and drummer Raj Punjabi, formed a band under the name Sweet Children. One of their first songs written together was "Best Thing in Town". The group's first live performance took place on October 17, 1987, at Rod's Hickory Pit in Vallejo, California. In 1988, Armstrong and Dirnt began working with former Isocracy drummer John Kiffmeyer, also known as "Al Sobrante", who replaced original drummer Raj Punjabi. It was also around this time that bassist Sean Hughes left the band, causing Dirnt to switch from guitar to bass. Armstrong cites the band Operation Ivy (which featured Tim Armstrong and Matt Freeman, who would later contact Armstrong to fill in as a possible second guitarist for their band Rancid) as a major influence, and a group that inspired him to form a band.

In 1988, Larry Livermore, owner of Lookout! Records, saw the band play an early show and signed the group to his label. In April 1989, the band released its debut extended play, 1,000 Hours. Shortly before the EP's release, the group dropped the Sweet Children name; according to Livermore, this was done to avoid confusion with another local band Sweet Baby. The band adopted the name Green Day, due to the members' fondness for cannabis. The phrase, "Green day", was slang in the Bay Area, where the band originated, for spending a day doing nothing but smoking marijuana. Armstrong once admitted in 2001 that he considered it to be "the worst band name in the world".

Lookout! released Green Day's debut studio album, 39/Smooth in early 1990. Green Day recorded two extended plays later that year, Slappy and Sweet Children, the latter of which included older songs that the band had recorded for the Minneapolis independent record label Skene! Records. In 1991, Lookout! Records re-released 39/Smooth under the name 1,039/Smoothed Out Slappy Hours, and added the songs from the band's first two EPs, Slappy, and 1,000 Hours.  In late 1990, shortly after the band's first nationwide tour, Kiffmeyer left the East Bay area to attend Humboldt State University in Arcata, California. The Lookouts' drummer Tré Cool began filling in as a temporary replacement and later Cool's position as Green Day's drummer became permanent, which Kiffmeyer "graciously accepted". The band went on tour for most of 1992 and 1993, and played a number of shows overseas in Europe. The band's second studio album Kerplunk sold 50,000 copies in the U.S. Green Day supported another California punk band, Bad Religion, as an opening act for their Recipe for Hate Tour for most of 1993.

Signing with Reprise Records and breakthrough success (1993–1995) 

Kerplunks underground success led to interest from some major record labels and a bidding war to sign Green Day. The band eventually left Lookout! and signed with Reprise Records after attracting the attention of producer Rob Cavallo. The group was impressed by his work with the fellow Californian band the Muffs and later remarked that Cavallo "was the only person we could talk to and connect with". Reflecting on the period, Armstrong told Spin magazine in 1999, "I couldn't go back to the punk scene, whether we were the biggest success in the world or the biggest failure ... The only thing I could do was get on my bike and go forward." After signing with Reprise, the band went to work on recording its major-label debut, Dookie. On September 3, 1993, Green Day played their last show at 924 Gilman under the pseudonym Blair Hess before being banned permanently for their major label signing.

Recorded in three weeks, and released in February 1994, Dookie became a commercial success, helped by extensive MTV airplay for the videos of the songs "Longview", "Basket Case", and "When I Come Around", all of which reached the number one position on the Modern Rock Tracks charts. The album went on to sell over 10 million copies in the US. At a performance on September 9, 1994, at Hatch Memorial Shell in Boston, mayhem broke out during the band's set (cut short to seven songs) and by the end of the rampage, 100 people were injured and 45 arrested. The band also joined the lineups of both the Lollapalooza festival and Woodstock '94, where the group started an infamous mud fight. During the concert, a security guard mistook bassist Mike Dirnt for a stage-invading fan and punched out some of his teeth. Viewed by millions by pay-per-view television, the Woodstock 1994 performance further aided Green Day's growing publicity and recognition. In 1995, Dookie won the Grammy Award for Best Alternative Album and the band was nominated for nine MTV Video Music Awards including Video of the Year. In the band's homestead of the East Bay following Dookie'''s success, the band felt a sense of unwelcoming. Billie Joe Armstrong recalled aggressive glares and furtive whispers. The band's success would trickle content onto other East Bay bands such as Jawbreaker, a local favorite of Armstrong's, which garnered accusations of selling out during a concert attended by Armstrong.

 Middle years and decline in popularity (1995-2002) 
In 1995, a single for the Angus soundtrack was released, entitled "J.A.R.". The single debuted at number one on the Billboard Modern Rock Tracks chart. The song was followed by the band's fourth studio album, Insomniac, which was released in fall 1995. Insomniac was a much darker and heavier response to the band's newfound popularity, compared to the more melodic Dookie. The album opened to a warm critical reception, earning 4 out of 5 stars from Rolling Stone, which said "In punk, the good stuff unfolds and gains meaning as you listen without sacrificing any of its electric, haywire immediacy. And Green Day are as good as this stuff gets." The singles released from Insomniac were "Geek Stink Breath", "Stuck with Me", "Brain Stew/Jaded", and "Walking Contradiction".

Though the album did not approach the success of Dookie, it sold three million copies in the United States. The album earned the band award nominations for Favorite Artist, Favorite Hard Rock Artist, and Favorite Alternative Artist at the 1996 American Music Awards, and the video for "Walking Contradiction" got the band a Grammy nomination for Best Video, Short Form, in addition to a Best Special Effects nomination at the MTV Video Music Awards. After that, the band abruptly canceled a European tour, citing exhaustion.

After a brief hiatus in 1996, Green Day began work on its next album in 1997. From the outset, both the band and Cavallo agreed that the album had to be different from its previous albums. The result was Nimrod, an experimental deviation from the band's standard melodic punk rock. The album was released in October 1997. It provided a variety of music, from punk, pop, hardcore, folk, surf rock, ska, and the acoustic ballad, "Good Riddance (Time of Your Life)".Myers, 2006. pp. 152-153 Nimrod entered the charts at number 10. The mainstream success of "Good Riddance" won the band an MTV Video Award for Best Alternative Video. The song was also used in the second "clip show" episode of Seinfeld and on two episodes of ER.

The other singles released from Nimrod were "Nice Guys Finish Last", "Hitchin' a Ride" and "Redundant". The band made a guest appearance in an episode of King of the Hill, which aired in 1997. In late 1997 and most of 1998, Green Day embarked on a tour in support of Nimrod.Spitz, 2006, p. 134 In 1999, guitarist Jason White began supporting the band during concerts as a rhythm guitarist.

In 2000, Green Day released their folk punk-inspired sixth studio album Warning. In support of the album, the band participated in the Warped Tour in 2000. In November 2000, the band performed for free on the steps on San Francisco's City Hall to protest the eviction of artists from the city in a show produced by Ian Brennan. The band also had an independent tour to support the album in 2001. Critics' reviews of the album were varied. AllMusic gave it 4.5/5 saying "Warning may not be an innovative record per se, but it's tremendously satisfying." Rolling Stone was more critical, giving it 3/5, and saying "Warning... invites the question: Who wants to listen to songs of faith, hope and social commentary from what used to be snot-core's biggest-selling band?" Though it produced the hit "Minority" and a smaller hit with "Warning", some observers were coming to the conclusion that the band was losing relevance, and a decline in popularity followed. While all of Green Day's previous albums had reached a status of at least triple platinum, Warning was only certified gold.

At the 2001 California Music Awards, Green Day won all eight of the awards for which the group was nominated. The group won the awards for Outstanding Album (Warning), Outstanding Punk Rock/Ska Album (Warning), Outstanding Group, Outstanding Male Vocalist, Outstanding Bassist, Outstanding Drummer, Outstanding Songwriter, and Outstanding Artist.

The release of two compilation albums, International Superhits! and Shenanigans, followed Warning. International Superhits! and its companion collection of music videos, International Supervideos!. Shenanigans contained some of the band's B-sides, including "Espionage", which was featured in the film Austin Powers: The Spy Who Shagged Me and was nominated for a Grammy Award for Best Rock Instrumental Performance.

In spring 2002, Green Day co-headlined the Pop Disaster Tour with Blink-182, which was documented on the DVD Riding in Vans with Boys.

 American Idiot and renewed success (2003–2006) 

In summer 2003, the band went into a studio to write and record material for an album, tentatively titled Cigarettes and Valentines. After completing 20 tracks, the master recordings were stolen from the studio. Instead of re-recording the stolen tracks, the band decided to abandon the entire project and start over, considering the taken material to be unrepresentative of the band's best work. It was then revealed that a band called the Network was signed to Armstrong's record label Adeline Records with little fanfare and information. After the band, who concealed their identities with masks and costumes, released an album called Money Money 2020, it was rumored that the Network was a Green Day side project, due to the similarities in the bands' sounds. However, these rumors were never addressed by the band or Adeline Records, except for a statement on the Adeline website discussing an ongoing dispute between the two bands. The bands "feuded" via press releases and statements from Armstrong. Several journalists openly referred to the group as a Green Day side project, although it was not confirmed as such until 2013.

Green Day collaborated with Iggy Pop on two tracks for his album Skull Ring in November 2003. On February 1, 2004, a cover of "I Fought the Law" made its debut on a commercial for iTunes during NFL Super Bowl XXXVIII. American Idiot (2004), debuted at number one on the Billboard charts, the band's first album to reach number one, backed by the success of the album's first single, "American Idiot". The album was labeled as a punk rock opera which follows the journey of the fictitious "Jesus of Suburbia". The album depicts modern American life under the control of an idiot ruler who lets people be misinformed by the media and a "redneck agenda". It gives different angles on an everyman, modern icons, and leaders. Released two months before U.S. President George W. Bush was reelected, the album became protest art. American Idiot won the 2005 Grammy for Best Rock Album. The band also won a total of seven out of eight awards for which the group was nominated, including the Viewer's Choice Award at the MTV Video Music Awards in 2005. The album went on to sell 6 million copies in the US.

In 2005, American Idiot won a Grammy Award for Best Rock Album and was nominated in six other categories including Album of the Year. The album helped Green Day win seven of the eight awards it was nominated for at the 2005 MTV Video Music Awards; the "Boulevard of Broken Dreams" video won six of those awards. A year later, "Boulevard of Broken Dreams" won a Grammy Award for Record of the Year. In 2009, Kerrang! named American Idiot the best album of the decade, NME ranked it number 60 in a similar list, and Rolling Stone ranked it 22nd. Rolling Stone also listed "Boulevard of Broken Dreams" and "American Idiot" among the 100 best songs of the 2000s, at number 65 and 47, respectively. In 2005, the album was ranked number 420 in Rock Hard magazine's book The 500 Greatest Rock & Metal Albums of All Time. In 2012, the album was ranked number 225 on Rolling Stones list of the 500 Greatest Albums of All Time.

While touring for American Idiot, the group filmed and recorded the two concerts at the Milton Keynes National Bowl in England. These recordings were released as a live CD and DVD called Bullet in a Bible on November 15, 2005. The DVD featured behind-the-scenes footage of the band, and showed how the band prepared to put on the show. The final shows of its 2005 world tour were in Sydney and Melbourne in Australia, on December 14 and 17, respectively.

On August 1, 2005, Green Day announced that it had rescinded the master rights to its pre-Dookie material from Lookout! Records, citing a continuing breach of contract regarding unpaid royalties, a complaint shared with other Lookout! bands. On January 10, 2006, the band was awarded a People's Choice Award as favorite musical group or band.

 21st Century Breakdown and American Idiots stage adaptation (2007–2010) 
Green Day engaged in many other smaller projects in the time following the success of American Idiot. In 2008, the group released a garage rock-inspired album under the name Foxboro Hot Tubs entitled Stop Drop and Roll!!! The Foxboro Hot Tubs went on a mini-tour during the same year to promote the record, hitting tiny Bay Area venues including the Stork Club in Oakland and Toot's Tavern in Crockett, California.

In an interview with Carson Daly, Garbage lead singer Shirley Manson revealed that Butch Vig would be producing Green Day's forthcoming album. The span of nearly five years between American Idiot and 21st Century Breakdown was the longest gap between studio albums in Green Day's career. The band had been working on new material since January 2006. By October 2007, Armstrong had 45 songs written, but the band showed no further signs of progress until October 2008, when two videos showing the band recording in the studio with producer Butch Vig were posted on YouTube. The writing and recording process, spanning three years and four recording studios, was finally finished in April 2009.21st Century Breakdown, was released on May 15, 2009. The album received a mainly positive reception from critics, getting an average rating between 3 and 4 stars. After the release, the album reached number one in fourteen countries, being certified gold or platinum in each. 21st Century Breakdown achieved Green Day's best chart performance to date. The band started playing shows in California in April and early May. These were the group's first live shows in about three years. Green Day went on a world tour that started in North America in July 2009 and continuing around the world throughout the rest of 2009 and early 2010. The album won the Grammy Award for Best Rock Album at the 52nd Grammy Awards on January 31, 2010. As of December 2010, 21st Century Breakdown has sold 1,005,000 copies in the US.

Wal-Mart refused to carry the album as it contains a Parental Advisory sticker and requested that Green Day release a censored edition. The band members did not wish to change any lyrics on the album and responded by stating, "There's nothing dirty about our record... They want artists to censor their records in order to be carried in there. We just said no. We've never done it before. You feel like you're in 1953 or something."

In 2009, the band met with award-winning director Michael Mayer and many cast and crew members of the Tony Award-winning musical Spring Awakening to create a stage version of the album American Idiot. American Idiot opened in the Berkeley Repertory Theatre during the end of 2009. The show features an expanded story of the original album, with new characters such as Will, Extraordinary Girl, and Favorite Son. On April 20, 2010, American Idiot opened on Broadway, and Green Day released the soundtrack to the musical, featuring a new song by Green Day entitled "When It's Time". In June 2010 iTunes released "When It's Time" as a single.

During the Spike TV Video Game Awards 2009, it was announced that Green Day was set to have its own Rock Band video game titled Green Day: Rock Band, as a follow-up to the last band specific Rock Band game, The Beatles: Rock Band. The game features the full albums of Dookie, American Idiot, and 21st Century Breakdown as well as select songs from the rest of Green Day's discography.

During the second leg of the 21st Century Breakdown World Tour the band members stated that they were writing new material. In an interview with Kerrang! magazine, Armstrong spoke about the possible new album: "We did some demos in Berlin, some in Stockholm, some just outside of Glasgow and some in Amsterdam. We wanted get [the songs] down in some early form." The band members also stated that the group was recording a live album of the tour, featuring the previously unreleased song "Cigarettes and Valentines". In October 2010, Dirnt was interviewed by Radio W, mentioning that the group had completed the writing process of the ninth studio album. In the interview, Dirnt also mentioned that a new live album would "most likely" be released. The live CD/DVD and CD/Blu-ray entitled Awesome as Fuck was released on March 22, 2011.

 ¡Uno! ¡Dos! ¡Tré! (2011–2014) 

During the end of 2011, the band played several secret shows (under the name Foxboro Hot Tubs) whose setlists consisted almost entirely of previously unheard songs. Green Day entered the studio and began recording new material in February 2012, later announcing a trilogy of albums titled ¡Uno!, ¡Dos!, and ¡Tré! which would be released in fall 2012. The trilogy marked longtime touring guitarist Jason White's induction as the fourth member of the band. That summer Green Day played several festivals and promotional shows including the Rock en Seine festival in France, the Rock am See festival in Germany, and the Reading Festival in the United Kingdom.¡Uno!, ¡Dos!, and ¡Tré! were released on September 21, November 9, and December 7, 2012, respectively, and were met with generally positive reviews from critics, though fans were more lukewarm towards the albums. On January 22, 2013, the band announced that ¡Cuatro!, a documentary about the making of ¡Uno!, ¡Dos! and ¡Tré!, would premiere on January 26 in Aspen, Colorado as part of the X Games FILM showcase, and would be released on DVD April 9, 2013. Another documentary was announced called Broadway Idiot which focuses on the creation on the American Idiot musical and Armstrong's run as playing the character of St. Jimmy. On March 10, 2013, Green Day began its 99 Revolutions Tour to support the trilogy. In June, Green Day broke Emirates Stadium attendance record with 60,000 tickets sold. The band played Dookie from start to finish on several dates on the tour's European leg, including during the Reading Festival 2013 headline show.Demolicious, a compilation album that contains alternate versions and demos of songs from ¡Uno!, ¡Dos! and ¡Tré! recorded during the studio sessions of these albums, was released on April 19, 2014, for Record Store Day. It also contains a previously unreleased song called "State of Shock" and an acoustic version of "Stay the Night", from ¡Uno!.

 Rock and Roll Hall of Fame and Revolution Radio (2014–2018) 

Green Day performed its first concert in a year on April 16, 2015. The group first played a set as Sweet Children with John Kiffmeyer, followed by a set as Green Day. On April 18, 2015, Green Day were inducted into the Rock and Roll Hall of Fame by Fall Out Boy.

On April 24, 2015, Rob Cavallo revealed Green Day were recording a twelfth studio album. Cavallo claimed to have heard "five new songs that Billie has written and demoed", and that the fans should be "sure that when they do return, the music will be amazing". On December 24, 2015, Green Day released a Christmas song, "Xmas Time of the Year".

On August 11, 2016, Green Day released the first single, "Bang Bang", from the group's album Revolution Radio, which was released on October 7, 2016. Likely due to his tonsil cancer diagnosis, Jason White decided to return to his role as a touring member and did not participate in the album's recording sessions. The band went on a world tour supporting the album. In November 2016, the band performed at the American Music Awards in Los Angeles and made a political statement about the then-recent US election of Donald Trump by chanting "No Trump, No KKK, No Fascist USA" during their rendition of "Bang Bang".

Aaron Burgess at Alternative Press observed, "It's the first time in years Green Day haven't had all the answers. But as a statement on how it feels to fight, it's the closest to the truth they've ever gotten." Gwilym Mumford of The Guardian stated "[after their last few albums] the band have decided to get back to basics: Revolution Radio is their most focused work in years. Lead single Bang Bang sets the tone, with a caustic consideration of the fame-hungry psychosis of a mass shooter.

The band released their second greatest hits compilation, God's Favorite Band, on November 17, 2017. It contains 20 of their hits, along with two new tracks: a different version of the Revolution Radio track "Ordinary World", featuring country singer Miranda Lambert, and a previously unreleased song titled "Back in the USA".

 Father of All Motherfuckers and future (2019–present) 
On April 13, 2019, for Record Store Day, the band released their Woodstock 1994 performance on vinyl for the first time. It contains all 9 songs they played live, as well as audio of the ensuing mud fight. On September 10, 2019, the band announced the Hella Mega Tour with Fall Out Boy and Weezer as headliners alongside themselves, with the Interrupters as the opening act. They also released the single, "Father of All..." off their thirteenth album, Father of All Motherfuckers. The same day, in an interview with KROQ, Armstrong announced the band would be parting ways with Reprise after the album's release, as they were off their contract with Warner. On September 30, 2019, Green Day signed a two-year agreement with the National Hockey League (NHL). The album's second single, "Fire, Ready, Aim", was released on October 9, 2019. The album's third single, "Oh Yeah!", was released on January 16, 2020. The album was released on February 7, 2020. The album's fourth single, "Meet Me on the Roof", was released on the same day as the album.

On April 6, 2020, Armstrong revealed that he had written six songs intending to record new music with the band once the COVID-19 pandemic had passed. On May 21, 2020, the band released a cover of Blondie's "Dreaming".

On October 30, 2020, the band's secret side project, the Network, teased upcoming activity with a video entitled "The Prophecy" and mentioned their upcoming sequel album. Then on November 2, 2020, the Network released a music video for their first song in 17 years, named "Ivankkka Is a Nazi". After a couple of weeks of small hints on social media, as well as Green Day claiming they were not the Network, the band released an EP on November 20, 2020, titled Trans Am. On December 4, 2020, the Network released their second album Money Money 2020 Part II: We Told Ya So!.

In February 2021, Green Day announced a single, titled "Here Comes the Shock", which was later released on February 21, 2021. The band would release a remastered version of Insomniac in March for the belated 25th anniversary of the album's release, with bonus live tracks. On May 17, 2021, Green Day released the single "Pollyanna". The reshuffled Hella Mega Tour would take place in the United States from July to September 2021, and the United Kingdom in June and July 2022. Between legs, on November 5, 2021, the band released the single "Holy Toledo!".BBC Sessions, the fourth live album by Green Day, was released on December 10, 2021. Eight days later, they put out a teaser video with the captions "RAK Studios. London, England. Green Day. 1972". 

In 2022, Green Day played a handful of major festivals in the United States, including Lollapalooza and Outside Lands. The band also played a surprise Lollapalooza aftershow set at Metro Chicago on July 29, a set that was mostly improvised. The set included their first performances of "Church on Sunday" and "Warning" since 2001, and also included fan favorite deep tracks "Whatsername", "Letterbomb", and "Murder City". 

On October 26, 2022, Green Day was announced as a headliner for the fifth annual Innings Festival in Arizona.Green Day was also announced as a headliner for the 2023 Harley-Davidson Homecoming and When We Were Young festivals.

 Musical style and influences 

Green Day's sound is often compared to first wave American and British punk rock bands such as the Ramones, Sex Pistols, the Clash, the Dickies, and Buzzcocks. Stylistically, several publications have characterized as punk rock,   skate punk, melodic punk, alternative rock, and power pop. Critics have disputed the qualification of the band as power pop. The band has casually explored other musical styles including  post-punk and pop-rock with 21st Century Breakdown, and garage rock on ¡Dos! and Father of All... Stephen Thomas Erlewine of AllMusic described Green Day as "punk revivalists who recharged the energy of speedy, catchy three-chord punk-pop songs." Among the labels of the band by critics, members Billie Joe Armstrong and Tre Cool have stated in interviews with Livewire and Kerrang! self-describing Green Day as just a punk rock band.

While Armstrong is the band's primary songwriter, he looks to the other band members for organizational help. Billie Joe Armstrong has mentioned that some of his biggest influences are seminal hardcore punk bands Hüsker Dü and the Replacements, and that their influence is particularly noted in the band's chord changes in songs. Green Day has covered Hüsker Dü's "Don't Want to Know If You Are Lonely" as a B-side to the "Warning" single, and the character "Mr. Whirly" in the group's song "Misery" is a reference to the Replacements song of the same name.

Outside of their punk influences, Green Day have also cited hard rock bands the Kinks, the Who, and Cheap Trick. In August 1996, Billie Joe Armstrong told Guitar World he "can remember a few different instances" of when he first discovered punk rock: "There were these two guys who introduced me to things like D.O.A. and the Dead Kennedys. Then, in the seventh grade, there was a girl at school who would bring in records like T.S.O.L. and say, 'Here, listen to this.'" Armstrong said he thinks he "really started getting into" punk rock "in 1987 with Turn It Around!, a double seven-inch compilation record put out by [punk fanzine] Maximumrocknroll." Armstrong cited Turn It Around! as an influence, calling it "a pretty big record" for him. Armstrong would also cite fellow East Bay punk bands Operation Ivy, Jawbreaker, and Crimpshrine as influences. Tré Cool has stated that the band is influenced by music that they didn't like, naming artists like Hall & Oates, Cyndi Lauper and other 1980s music.

Although Green Day has been compared to the Buzzcocks, the Ramones and the Clash, Mike Dirnt said he had never heard the Buzzcocks when Green Day began. Dirnt said: "First off, you can't sound like any of those bands. And secondly, those are probably the last ones in my record collection." Armstrong responded to Dirnt, saying: "Mine too. Those are all bands I got into later." The Dickies is another band Green Day has been compared to. Dirnt said he "never owned a Dickies album, although" he "did see" the Dickies live "around the time of" Kerplunk!. Dirnt said "by that time, we'd played so many shows it had no bearing." Armstrong referred to the Dickies as "just another Ramones rip-off". Although in August 1996, Armstrong said bands like the Ramones are bands he listened to later, in June 2010, Armstrong cited the Ramones as an influence. He also said his "range of favorite songwriters goes anywhere from the Sex Pistols to Lennon–McCartney. During the American Idiot and 21st Century Breakdown era of Green Day, the band was influenced by the Who, U2, Motown albums, and musicals such as Grease.

 Legacy 
The band's 1991 album Kerplunk is one of the best-selling independent albums of all time, selling over 4.5 million copies worldwide. It was also listed in 100 greatest indie albums by Blender in 2007.

Green Day is credited (alongside Bad Religion, the Offspring, NOFX, Social Distortion, and Rancid) with popularizing mainstream interest in punk rock in the United States, particularly with the album Dookie, which was cited by Fuse as the most important pop-punk album of all time, the best alternative album of 1994 by Rolling Stone, and as one of the best punk rock albums of all time by Rolling Stone, Kerrang!, Revolver, and LA Weekly. It was also placed on the Rock and Roll Hall of Fame's "Definitive 200" list of 200 classic albums. Both Dookie and American Idiot appeared on Rolling Stones list of the 500 Greatest Albums of All Time. In 2011, they were voted best punk rock band of all time by Rolling Stone. Diffuser.fm listed Dookie as the greatest album of the 90s.

Green Day has sold more than 90 million records worldwide making them one of the highest-selling artists of all time. The group has been nominated for 20 Grammy awards and has won five of them with Best Alternative Album for Dookie, Best Rock Album for American Idiot and 21st Century Breakdown, Record of the Year for "Boulevard of Broken Dreams", and Best Musical Show Album for American Idiot: The Original Broadway Cast Recording.

In 2010, a stage adaptation of American Idiot debuted on Broadway. The musical was nominated for three Tony Awards: The band was inducted into the Rock and Roll Hall of Fame in April 2015, their first year of eligibility.

The band has been cited as an influence by a variety of artists, including Avril Lavigne, AFI, Fall Out Boy, Blink-182, Lady Gaga, Wavves, Fidlar, Tegan and Sara, the Menzingers, Bowling for Soup and Sum 41.

 Related projects 

Since 1991, members of the band have branched out past Green Day, starting other projects with various musicians. Notable projects related to Green Day include Billie Joe Armstrong's Pinhead Gunpowder with Jason White and the Longshot with Jeff Matika, the Frustrators with Mike Dirnt, and the Network, a collaboration between Green Day and friends in which all members play under fake stage names. Green Day has also released an album titled Stop Drop and Roll!!! on May 20, 2008, under the name Foxboro Hot Tubs, which the band uses to book secret shows. In late December 2011, Armstrong formed a family band called the Boo which recorded a one-off Christmas record for their friends and family making a few copies available in a local store. Since January 2018, Armstrong, Dirnt and White have played in the band the Coverups along with Green Day audio engineer Chris Dugan and tour manager Bill Schneider. The band sporadically performs one-off shows, usually in small clubs, and cover the songs of classic rock and alternative rock bands such as Cheap Trick, Tom Petty and the Heartbreakers, the Clash, and Nirvana.

In September 2006, Green Day collaborated with U2 and producer Rick Rubin to record a cover of the song "The Saints Are Coming", originally recorded by the Skids, with an accompanying video. The song was recorded to benefit Music Rising, an organization to help raise money for musicians' instruments lost during Hurricane Katrina, and to bring awareness on the eve of the one-year anniversary of the disaster. In December 2006, Green Day and NRDC opened a web site in partnership to raise awareness on America's dependency on oil.

Green Day released a cover of the John Lennon song "Working Class Hero", which was featured on the album Instant Karma: The Amnesty International Campaign to Save Darfur. The band performed the song on the season finale of American Idol. The song was nominated for a Grammy Award in 2008 but lost to the White Stripes' "Icky Thump". That summer, the band appeared in a cameo role in The Simpsons Movie, where the band performed a rock version of the show's theme song. Their version of it was released as a single on July 23, 2007.

In 2009, the band collaborated with theater director Michael Mayer to adapt the group's rock opera American Idiot into a one-act stage musical that premiered at the Berkeley Rep on September 15, 2009. The show then moved to Broadway on April 20, 2010. The reviews of American Idiot: The Musical have been positive to mixed. Charles Isherwood of The New York Times wrote an enthusiastic review for the Broadway production. He called the show "a pulsating portrait of wasted youth that invokes all the standard genre conventions ... only to transcend them through the power of its music and the artistry of its execution, the show is as invigorating and ultimately as moving as anything I've seen on Broadway this season. Or maybe for a few seasons past." Jed Gottlieb of the Boston Herald enjoyed the premise of the show but found that "the music and message suffer in a setting where the audience is politely, soberly seated".

Michael Kuchiwara of the Associated Press found the show to be "visually striking [and] musically adventurous", but noted that "the show has the barest wisp of a story and minimal character development". Paul Kolnik in USA Today enjoyed the contradiction that Green Day's "massively popular, starkly disenchanted album ... would be the feel-good musical of the season". Time magazine's Richard Zoglin opined that the score "is as pure a specimen of contemporary punk rock as Broadway has yet encountered, [yet] there's enough variety. ... Where the show falls short is as a fully developed narrative." He concluded that "American Idiot, despite its earnest huffing and puffing, remains little more than an annotated rock concert. ... Still, [it] deserves at least two cheers—for its irresistible musical energy and for opening fresh vistas for that odd couple, rock and Broadway." Peter Travers from Rolling Stone, in his review of American Idiot, wrote "Though American Idiot carries echoes of such rock musicals as Tommy, Hair, Rent and Spring Awakening, it cuts its own path to the heart. You won't know what hit you. American Idiot knows no limits—it's a global knockout." The musical has been nominated for three Tony Awards, including Best Musical and Best Scenic Design. It was also nominated for several Drama Desk Awards and Outer Critics Circle Awards.

In October 2009, a Green Day art project was exhibited at StolenSpace Gallery in London. The exhibition showed artworks created for each of the songs on 21st Century Breakdown, was supported by the band, and led by the group's manager Pat Magnarella. He explained in an interview that "[Artists are] basically like rock bands. Most are creating their art, but don't know how to promote it." For Billie Joe Armstrong, "Many of the artists... show their work on the street, and we feel a strong connection to that type of creative expression."

On April 13, 2011, a film version of American Idiot was confirmed. Michael Mayer, director of the Broadway musical, will be directing the film. It will be produced by Green Day, Pat Magnarella (Green Day's manager who also produced Bullet in a Bible, Awesome as Fuck, and Heart Like a Hand Grenade), Playtone (Tom Hanks and Gary Goetzman) and Tom Hulce. However, in February 2020, Billie Joe Armstrong revealed to NME that plans for a film adaptation of the stage musical had been "pretty much scrapped", without providing any more details as to the reason.

On January 23, 2013, it was announced that a documentary showing Armstrong's journey from punk rock to Broadway was to be released. Called Broadway Idiot and showing a lot of behind-the-scenes of the American Idiot musical production, the movie was directed by Doug Hamilton, veteran television journalist for CBS News' 60 Minutes and PBS documentaries such as Nova, Frontline and American Masters. A trailer was released on January 30, 2013. The documentary premiered at the South by Southwest Film Festival on March 15, 2013.

Green Day served as executive producers of Turn It Around: The Story of East Bay Punk (2017), an extensive documentary film about the San Francisco Bay area punk scene from the late 1970s to the 1990s.

 Controversies 
Green Day has generated controversy over whether their musical style and major-label status constitutes "true punk". In reaction to both the style of music and the background of the band, John Lydon, former frontman of the 1970s punk band the Sex Pistols commented, "So there we are fending off all that and it pisses me off that years later a wank outfit like Green Day hop in and nick all that and attach it to themselves. They didn't earn their wings to do that and if they were true punk they wouldn't look anything like they do." However, others in the punk rock scene would come to the defense of the band on their punk status. Bad Religion lead guitarist Brett Gurewitz and founder of the independent punk label Epitaph Records would state, "They [Green Day] are a punk band, but you know, punk is the legacy of rock and roll, and Green Day are the biggest band in the genre."

Armstrong has discussed the group's status of being a punk band on a major record label, saying, "Sometimes I think we've become redundant because we're this big band now; we've made a lot of money—we're not punk rock anymore. But then I think about it and just say, 'You can take us out of a punk rock environment, but you can't take the punk rock out of us. In 2021, Armstrong condemned the band's labeling as "pop-punk" by critics in a Vulture magazine interview, stating, "I never really liked that term (pop punk), it turned into sort of a genre. I never thought of myself as a pop artist. I’ve always been left of center. To say you're a pop-punker … it never sat well with me." Armstrong acknowledged the band's more melodic punk style compared to other bands from the Bay Area scene it emerged from, but also brought up the band's performance alongside East Bay hardcore bands like Neurosis, Engage, Spitboy, Blatz, and Filth.

In 2006, English rock musician Noel Gallagher of the Britpop band Oasis complained about the band semi-jokingly, claiming that the band had ripped off his song "Wonderwall" with "Boulevard of Broken Dreams".

On September 21, 2012, while Green Day was performing at the iHeartRadio music festival, Armstrong stopped while performing "Basket Case", because he believed the group's time was being shortened, possibly to extend R&B artist Usher's performance. Angered, Armstrong began ranting while a screen in the rear of the audience was labeled "1 Minutes Left", saying "You're gonna give me one fucking minute? You've gotta be fucking kidding me!" He also told the crowd he "was not Justin Bieber" and labeled the festival as a "joke". When the screen went blank, Armstrong smashed his guitar, while bassist Mike Dirnt smashed his bass. Armstrong then gave the finger, and declared that Green Day would be back before throwing his microphone down and walking off the stage. Two days later, the band's representative apologized for the incident on the group's behalf stating that "Green Day would like everyone to know that their set was not cut short by Clear Channel and to apologize to those they offended at the iHeartRadio Festival in Las Vegas" also adding that Armstrong would be headed to rehab, for abuse of alcohol and prescription pills. However, Dirnt would later say in an interview with Rolling Stone that he agreed with what Armstrong meant by his rant. The band later made amends with the company and played an album release party for their 2016 release, Revolution Radio. They also returned to the festival in 2019 supporting the album Father of All Motherfuckers.

Some fans were upset at the band and festival organizers for continuing the show, which was attended by about 35,000 people. On their website, Armstrong said the band did not know about the accident before their set, and likely would not have played if they had.

 Band members 

Current members
 Billie Joe Armstrong – lead vocals, guitars (1987–present); keyboards, harmonica (2000–present)
 Mike Dirnt – bass (1988–present); backing and occasional lead vocals (1987–present); guitars (1987–1988)
 Tré Cool – drums, percussion, backing and occasional lead vocals (1990–present)

Current touring musicians
 Jason Freese – keyboards, saxophone, trombone, backing vocals, occasional acoustic guitar (2004–present)
 Jason White – guitars, backing vocals (1999–present)
 Kevin Preston – guitars, backing vocals (2019–present)

Former members
 Raj Punjabi – drums, backing vocals (1987)
 Sean Hughes – bass (1987–1988)
 John Kiffmeyer – drums, percussion, backing vocals (1987–1990; one-off guest appearance in 2015)

Former touring musicians
 Aaron Cometbus – drums, backing vocals (1990)
 Dave "E.C." Henwood – drums, backing vocals (1990)
 Garth Schultz – trombone, trumpet (1997–1999)
 Gabrial McNair – trombone, saxophone (1999–2001)
 Kurt Lohmiller – trumpet, percussion (1999–2004)
 Mike Pelino – guitars, backing vocals (2004–2005)
 Ronnie Blake – trumpet, backing vocals, percussion (2004–2005)
 Bobby Schneck – guitars, backing vocals (2004–2005)
 Jeff Matika – guitars, backing vocals (2009–2019)

Timeline

 Awards and nominations 

Green Day has earned 214 award nominations and 92 wins.

Discography

Studio albums
 39/Smooth (1990)
 Kerplunk (1991)
 Dookie (1994)
 Insomniac (1995)
 Nimrod (1997)
 Warning (2000)
 American Idiot (2004)
 21st Century Breakdown (2009)
 ¡Uno! (2012)
 ¡Dos! (2012)
 ¡Tré! (2012)
 Revolution Radio (2016)
 Father of All Motherfuckers (2020)

See alsoGreen Day: Rock BandGreen Day related projects
List of best-selling albums in the United States

References

Further reading
 
 
 Spitz, Marc. Nobody Likes You: Inside the Turbulent Life, Times, and Music of Green Day''. New York: Hyperion, 2006. 
 The Green Day Story (Broadcast on Radio 1 Mon June 20, 2005) (Alternate Link (rpm. file))

External links

 
 

 
1987 establishments in California
Adeline Records artists
Alternative rock groups from California
American musical trios
American power pop groups
American punk rock groups
Brit Award winners
Grammy Award winners
Juno Award for International Album of the Year winners
Kerrang! Awards winners
Musical groups established in 1987
Musical groups from Berkeley, California
Musical quartets
Pop punk groups from California
Punk rock groups from California
Reprise Records artists
Skate punk groups
Warner Music Group artists